Bucculatrix eremospora is a moth in the family Bucculatricidae. The species was first described by Edward Meyrick in 1936. It is found in Taiwan.

References

Natural History Museum Lepidoptera generic names catalog

Bucculatricidae
Moths described in 1936
Taxa named by Edward Meyrick
Moths of Asia